Shykh Seraj (born 7 September 1954) is a Bangladeshi journalist, media personality and agriculture development activist. He was awarded Ekushey Padak in 1995 and Independence Day Award in 2018 by the Government of Bangladesh.

Early life
Seraj completed SSC from Khilgaon Govt. High School & HSC from Notre Dame College, Dhaka. Seraj earned his M.A. degree in geography from the University of Dhaka.

Career

Seraj co-anchored a television series Mati O Manush (Men and Soil) on Bangladesh Television since 1982. The television program featured investigative documentaries and in-depth reporting and points out solutions to the various problems that farmers face. In his work, Seraj visits remote areas, talks with farmers, conducts filming, searches for stories, and encourages young educated generations to engage in farming. In 1999, he became the director of News at Channel i. In 2004, Seraj started a new programme at Channel i named Hridoye Mati O Manush (Soil and Men in Heart) based on the format of his earlier program Mati O Manush.

Seraj created a game show where contestants compete for best farm skills.

Awards and honors
 Nattya Sheba Purashker, 1983
 Rotary International Award, 1989
 Rotary International Award, 1991 
 US Ashoka Fellowship for poverty elimination television program (1992) 
 Rotary International Award, 1993
 National Youth Award, 1993
 National Poultry Award, 1993
 National Fish Fortnight Award, 1994
 Presidents' Award on Agriculture, 1995
 Ekushey Padak (1995)
 National Fish Fortnight Award, 1996
 Rotary International Award, 1996
 Young Asia Television Award, 2002
 Sheltech Award, 2004
 Entertainment Screen Award 2004
 Cultural Reporters' Award 2004
 Rotary International Award, 2005
 Bangabandhu Gold Medal 2005
 Gold Medal in National Fish Fortnight Award 2005
 Gold Medal in Development of Economy 2005
 Dr. Ibrahim Memorial Gold Medal 2006
 Unitrend 'Son of the Soil' Award 2006
 Bangladesh Economic Association Gold Medal 2006
 World Food Program Media Award 2006
 Rotary International Award, 2007
 Honoured by Sir William Beveridge Foundation, 2009
 UNESCO Bangladesh Journalism Awards, 2009
 Rotary Seed Award, 2009
 A.H. Boerma Award by Food and Agriculture Organization of the UN (2009)
 Bangladesh Economic Association Gold Medal
 UK's BCA Golden Jubilee Honour Award, 2010 
 House of Commons Honorary Crest, 2011 (UK)
 Dr Ibrahim Memorial Gold Medal
 Ranada Prasad Saha Gold Medal
 Green Award from Birmingham community, 2015
 Gusi Peace Prize, 2015 (Philippines)
 Ranada Prasad Saha Gold Medal 2016
 Independence Day Award, (2018)

References

External links 
 
 
 Youth Asian TV's documentary on Shykh Seraj

1954 births
Living people
People from Chandpur District
Notre Dame College, Dhaka alumni
University of Dhaka alumni
Bangladeshi journalists
Honorary Fellows of Bangla Academy
Recipients of the Ekushey Padak
Recipients of the Independence Day Award